Post No Bills may refer to:
 A sign intended to discourage unauthorized flyposting, the phrase's original meaning
 Post No Bills (1896 film), an 1896 French short black-and-white silent comedy film
 Post No Bills (1923 film), a 1923 American comedy short film, starring James Parrott
 Post No Bills (1992 film), a 1992 American documentary film